Scott Andrews (born 1 August 1989) is a Welsh international rugby union player for Pro14 side Cardiff Blues. He plays mainly as a prop, but can also cover lock and hooker.

Domestic career

In September 2017, English side Bath announced that they had signed Andrews on a one-month loan deal.

International career
In May 2010 Andrews was added to the Wales national rugby union team standby list for the summer matches due to injury to Gethin Jenkins. In January 2011 he was named the Wales squad for the 2011 Six Nations Championship. He was named in the preliminary squad for the 2011 Rugby World Cup but was ultimately left out of the final squad. He made his full international debut for Wales versus the Barbarians on 4 June 2011 as a second-half replacement.

References

External links
Cardiff Blues profile
Wales profile

1989 births
Living people
Bath Rugby players
Cardiff Rugby players
Rugby union players from Church Village
Rugby union props
Wales international rugby union players
Welsh rugby union players
Worcester Warriors players